Mohd Shukri bin Ramli (born 6 February 1961) is a Malaysian politician who has served as the 10th Menteri Besar of Perlis since  November 2022 and Member of the Perlis State Legislative Assembly (MLA) for Sanglang since May 2013. He served as Deputy Speaker of the assembly from 2013 to 2019. He is a member of the Malaysian Islamic Party (PAS), a component party of the ruling Perikatan Nasional (PN) coalition. He has also served as the State Chairman of PN of Perlis since January 2021 and the State Commissioner of PAS of Perlis since 2013.

Election Results

References

Living people
People from Perlis
Malaysian people of Malay descent
Malaysian Muslims
Malaysian Islamic Party politicians
Members of the Perlis State Legislative Assembly
21st-century Malaysian politicians
1961 births